XHSCBI-FM is a community radio station on 102.9 FM in Villahermosa, Tabasco. The station is owned by the civil association Kahal Sembradores de Futuro, A.C.

History
Kahal Sembradores de Futuro filed for a community station on May 12, 2017. The station was approved on January 23, 2019.

References

Radio stations in Tabasco
Community radio stations in Mexico
Radio stations established in 2019